Ambaralan is a neighbourhood in the Pazaryolu District of Erzurum Province in Turkey.

References

Villages in Pazaryolu District